Phasiini is a tribe of flies in the family Tachinidae. As a result of phylogenetic research, most members of this tribe were transferred to other tribes in the subfamily, leaving only the two genera Elomya and Phasia.

Genera
 Elomya Robineau-Desvoidy, 1830
 Phasia Latreille, 1804

References

Diptera of Europe
Phasiinae